George Walkem may refer to:

 George Anthony Walkem (1834–1908), British Columbian politician and jurist
 George Alexander Walkem (1872–1946), mechanical engineer, businessman and political figure in British Columbia